This is a list of airlines which have an air operator's certificate issued by the Civil Aviation Authority of Trinidad and Tobago.

See also
List of airlines
List of defunct airlines in Trinidad and Tobago

Airlines
Trinidad and Tobago
Airlines
Trinidad and Tobago
Trinidad and Tobago